NAPM is an acronym which can stand for:

National Academy of Popular Music
National Alliance of People's Movements, an organization in India
National Association of Presort Mailers
National Association of Purchasing Management
Photographic and Imaging Manufacturers Association, formerly National Association of Photographic Manufacturers